Lucerne is a ghost town in Adell Township, Sheridan County, Kansas, United States.  It is approximately 18 miles northeast of the county seat of Hoxie.

History
The town had a post office from 1880 until 1943.  As of 2010, the remains of the town included a cemetery, stone foundation, and a partial wooden sign that used to announce the town's name.  As of the 2010 census, the entirety of Adell Township had a population of only 12.

According to a 1912 reference work on Kansas, the town at that time held a population of 50, a general store, a hotel, a money order post office, and a daily stagecoach to the town of Jennings.

References

Further reading

External links
 Lucerne Cemetery interments, KSGenweb.com
 Lucerne photos, Kansas Historical Society
 Sheridan County maps: Current, Historic, KDOT